Hezari (also Romanized as Hezārī and Hazārī; also known as Azāhī, Ezārehī, Hazāreh, and Hezāreh’ī) is a village in Sarbuk Rural District, Sarbuk District, Qasr-e Qand County, Sistan and Baluchestan Province, Iran. At the 2006 census, its population was 671, in 118 families.

References 

Populated places in Qasr-e Qand County